Tyrsted Parish is a parish in the Diocese of Aarhus in Horsens Municipality, Denmark. It is located 2 miles southeast of Horsens, Jutland, Denmark.

Notable people 
 Inger Kathrine Jacobsen (1867 in Tyrsted – 1939) a New Zealand midwife
 Sebastian Hausner (2000–) a Danish footballer

References

Horsens Municipality
Parishes of Denmark